Play with the Teletubbies is an educational video game developed by Asylum Entertainment based on the British children's television series Teletubbies, it was released for Microsoft Windows in 1998 and PlayStation in 1999.

Gameplay 
The primary gameplay consists of choosing a Teletubby and choosing various activities to perform with them, such as a game of hide and seek, banging a drum, or controlling the speed of a train. Certain activities are unique depending on the Teletubby you choose to perform it with, such as the "Favourite Thing" activity, which features a unique item for each character. 

The game also features 11 live-action clips that can be viewed by interacting with the windmill at the top of the map. These clips feature children telling the audience about what they're doing that day, often something promoting creativity or being outdoors, such as herding sheep. These clips are very reminiscent of an actual segment of the original television series where the same thing happens. 2 magical events are also shown: a train and some clouds.

Development 
According to Dave Lee, director of BBC Multimedia at the time of the games development, the gameplay was extensively tested with young children, adding that the company was "delighted to see how quickly very young children adapted to using the PlayStation controls" when playing early versions of the software. The BBC hoped that the launch of the PS2 would cause more PlayStations to be passed on to younger members of the family increasing the possible player base.

Reception

Reviewing the PC version for AllGame, Brad Cook gave the game 4 stars out of 5, saying that the game did "an excellent job of transferring the popular British children's show to a computer game" and complimented it's graphics and sound. The same website would give the PlayStation version 3.5 out of 5 saying that there was "not much "game" in Play with the Teletubbies, at least not in the conventional sense of the word. But that is exactly what the developers had in mind" but was critical of the interface which he said was "not always obvious to young children."

References

External links
 

1998 video games
BBC Multimedia games
Children's educational video games
Educational video games
PlayStation (console) games
Single-player video games
Teletubbies
Video games based on television series
Video games developed in the United Kingdom
Windows games
Asylum Entertainment games